Yoshihiro Ito (born 5 June 1977 in Osaka) is a Japanese racing driver.

Career
Ito began his career competing in karting, and since then has competed mainly in single-seater racing in Japan. In 2009 he took part in two races of the Super GT series in a Porsche Boxster. In 2010 he made his World Touring Car Championship debut at the 2010 FIA WTCC Race of Japan at Okayama driving for Liqui Moly Team Engstler.

Complete Super GT results

References

External links

Living people
1977 births
Sportspeople from Osaka
Japanese racing drivers
Super GT drivers
World Touring Car Championship drivers
Engstler Motorsport drivers